Landoppo is a monotypic genus of Filipino comb-footed spiders containing the single species, Landoppo misamisoriensis. It was first described by A. T. Barrion & J. A. Litsinger in 1995, and is found in the Philippines.

Description

The cephalothorax is a pale
grayish yellow and has a broad dark gray arrow-like band with seven prominent lines. It has eight eyes in two rows, with a reddish brown color between them.

See also
 List of Theridiidae species

References

Monotypic Araneomorphae genera
Spiders of Asia
Theridiidae